Atherigona naqvii, the wheat stem fly, is a species of fly in the family Muscidae. It is a pest of the wheat plant, Triticum aestivum, and has also been known to affect maize crops.

References

Muscidae
Insect pests of millets